Futebol Clube de Alverca is a Portuguese football club based in Alverca do Ribatejo, Vila Franca de Xira. It currently plays in the Portuguese 3rd Division.

History
F.C. Alverca was founded on 1 September 1939.

After many decades in the lower levels of Portuguese football, Alverca was promoted to the top level in 1998, and played there in four of the next five editions, also coming back for 2003–04, which also ended in relegation; during most of this time, the club acted as feeder club to S.L. Benfica. Alverca played one more year in level two, before folding for financial reasons, in 2005.

In 2006, Alverca re-formed, beginning at regional level in the Lisbon Football Association's District Leagues, and being promoted in 2007–08 to the first division of that category.

In 2017–18, Alverca won promotion back to the national level, as district champions. On 17 October 2019, Alverca won 2–0 in the third round of the Taça de Portugal against Big Three club Sporting CP, becoming only the second third-tier club in history to knock that team out the cup; the other was F.C. Tirsense in 1948. Fellow Primeira Liga club Rio Ave F.C. beat Alverca by a single goal in the next round. Alex Apolinário, scorer of the first goal in the win over Sporting, died in January 2021 days after collapsing in a match for Alverca.

Stadium

The club's home venue is the 7,705 capacity Complexo Desportivo do FC Alverca.

Players

Current squad

League and cup history

References

External links
Official site 
Zerozero team profile

 
Football clubs in Portugal
Association football clubs established in 1939
1939 establishments in Portugal
Primeira Liga clubs
Liga Portugal 2 clubs